The Unknown Woman (also known as The Other Woman) is a 2006 Italian psychological thriller mystery film, directed by Giuseppe Tornatore that depicts a woman alone in a foreign country, haunted by a horrible past.

Plot
Irena (Kseniya Rappoport), a Ukrainian prostitute on the run, is determined to find a job in an elegant apartment building in northern Italy, and starts by cleaning the stairs. She does it in order to inch her way into working for a family residing in that building. She befriends Gina (Piera Degli Esposti), the nanny of the family's child, Thea (Clara Dossena), who lives with the family in their apartment. When the nanny is crippled in a fall—tripped by Irena, but presumed to be accidental—Irena is hired to take her place. Through flashbacks, viewers learn that Irena has been physically and emotionally abused, and forced to bear nine children, all taken away at birth to be sold to adoptive families. After stabbing her pimp and leaving him for dead, she sets out to find her youngest child, whom she believes is Thea; hence the plot to work for them. Adoption documents in the apartment convince her that Thea is indeed her daughter. The mother grows suspicious of Irena and fires her, despite the loving relationship that has grown up between Irena and the child. Irena's pimp stalks her and sends out thugs to beat her up as she walks down the street. He rigs her employer's car, leading to a crash in which Thea's mother is killed. The pimp forces Irena to drive him to a location that may or may not contain the money Irena stole from him when she left him for dead. During a struggle, he falls and is killed when his head hits a rock. Thea's father moves to a new apartment and prepares a room for Irena, but as the police suspect foul play in the death of Thea's mother, Irena is taken into custody. She reveals both that the true culprit is the pimp and that she killed him. She is tried, convicted, and sent to jail. Thea stops eating until the judge allows Irena to visit her in the hospital and feed her. DNA testing reveals that Thea is not Irena's daughter after all. After she gets out of jail, she finds Thea, now a young lady, waiting for her.

Cast
 Kseniya Rappoport as Irena
 Michele Placido as Muffa
 Claudia Gerini as Valeria Adacher
 Piera Degli Esposti as Gina
 Alessandro Haber as Matteo
 Clara Dossena as Thea Adacher
 Ángela Molina as Lucrezia (as Angela Molina)
 Margherita Buy as Irena's lawyer
 Pierfrancesco Favino as Donato Adacher
 Paolo Elmo as Nello, Irena's lover
 Nicola Di Pinto as Judge
 Valeria Flore as older Thea Adacher

Awards and nominations
 David di Donatello (Italy)
 Won: Best Actress – Leading Role (Kseniya Rappoport) 
 Won: Best Cinematography (Fabio Zamarion)
 Won: Best Director (Giuseppe Tornatore)
 Won: Best Film
 Won: Best Music (Ennio Morricone)
 Nominated: Best Actor – Leading Role (Michele Placido)
 Nominated: Best Costume Design (Nicoletta Ercole)
 Nominated: Best Editing (Massimo Quaglia)
 Nominated: Best Producer
 Nominated: Best Production Design (Tonino Zera)
 Nominated: Best Screenplay (Francesco Tornatore)
 Nominated: Best Sound (Gilberto Martinelli) 
 European Film Awards
 Won: Audience Award – Best Film (Giuseppe Tornatore) 
 Nominated: Best Actress – Leading Role (Kseniya Rappoport) 
 Nominated: Best Cinematographer (Fabio Zamarion)
 Nominated: Best Director (Giuseppe Tornatore)
 Moscow Film Festival (Russia)
 Won: Audience Award (Giuseppe Tornatore; tied with Molière)
 Won: Silver St. George – Best Director (Giuseppe Tornatore)
 Nominated: Golden St. George (Giuseppe Tornatore)
 Norwegian Film Festival (Norway) 
 Won: Audience Award (Giuseppe Tornatore)

References

External links

 
 

2006 films
2006 psychological thriller films
2000s mystery thriller films
Films set in Italy
Films directed by Giuseppe Tornatore
Italian thriller films
2000s Italian-language films
Films about human trafficking
Films scored by Ennio Morricone
Human trafficking in Ukraine
European Film Awards winners (films)